The Buffalo City Court Building, named Frank A. Sedita City Court, for Buffalo mayor Frank A. Sedita, is a 10-story court house built in 1974 for the city of Buffalo, New York. It is in Niagara Square and adjacent to Buffalo City Hall.

Design
The structure is a classic example of Brutalist architecture; its façade is dominated by large Precast concrete panels with narrow windows. The design was conceived by Buffalo architectural firm Pfohl, Roberts and Biggie's architecture firm with limited windows to keep the courtrooms and judges' chambers free from outside distraction.

Use
The building houses the 8th Judicial district Buffalo Housing Court, Landlord/Tenant Court, Small Claims, Commercial Claims, Criminal Court, and several parts of New York State Supreme Court for the County of Erie.

Gallery

References

External links
 
 
 History of the land site
 

Buildings and structures in Buffalo, New York
Architecture of Buffalo, New York
Government buildings completed in 1974
1970s architecture in the United States
Brutalist architecture in New York (state)
Skyscraper office buildings in Buffalo, New York